Idolia is a genus of clown beetles in the family Histeridae. There are about six described species in Idolia.

Species
These six species belong to the genus Idolia:
 Idolia antennata Lewis, 1888
 Idolia gibba Lewis, 1886
 Idolia laevigata Lewis, 1885
 Idolia laevissima (J. L. LeConte, 1852)
 Idolia punctisternum Lewis, 1885
 Idolia scitula Lewis, 1888

References

Further reading

 
 

Histeridae
Articles created by Qbugbot